Begonia venosa, the veined begonia, is a species of flowering plant in the family Begoniaceae, native to eastern Brazil. Kept as a houseplant for its striking foliage, it can handle more sunlight than the average begonia, and prefers a well-drained soil.

References

venosa
House plants
Endemic flora of Brazil
Flora of Northeast Brazil
Flora of Southeast Brazil
Plants described in 1899